James H. King (born February 9, 1943) is a retired American basketball player who competed in the 1968 Summer Olympics. He was born in Akron, Ohio.

A   forward, he was part of the American basketball team which won the gold medal. He played in all eight games.

Notes

External links
 

1943 births
Living people
Amateur Athletic Union men's basketball players
American men's basketball players
Basketball players at the 1968 Summer Olympics
Detroit Pistons draft picks
Medalists at the 1968 Summer Olympics
Oklahoma State Cowboys basketball players
Olympic gold medalists for the United States in basketball
United States men's national basketball team players
Forwards (basketball)